Autoinflammatory diseases (AIDs) are a group of rare disorders caused by dysfunction of the innate immune system. They are characterized by periodic or chronic systemic inflammation, usually without the involvement of adaptive immunity.

Autoinflammatory diseases are a separate class from autoimmune diseases. Both are characterized by an immune system malfunction which may cause similar symptoms, such as rash, swelling, or, fatigue, but the cardinal cause or mechanism of the diseases are different. A key difference is a malfunction of the innate immune system in AIDs, while in autoimmune diseases there is a malfunction of the adaptive immune system. 

The boundaries between autoinflammation (overactivity of the innate immunity), autoimmunity (overactivity of the adaptive immunity), and immunodeficiency (decreased activity of the innate or adaptive immunity) are often fluid. Clinical phenotypes associated with these processes are driven by the cell type most affected by a particular mutation or signal: excessive activation of neutrophils, monocytes/macrophages, and dendritic cells leads to autoinflammatory symptoms; T cell and B cell dysfunction lead to autoimmunity. Failure of innate and/or adaptive immune cells to appropriately activate, recognize, and clear infectious agents cause immunodeficiency and vulnerability to infection.

Classification 
Classification of autoinflammatory diseases is an active and evolving area of scientific research.

Clinical classification 
 Episodic and multisystemic AIDs (NLRP12-associated disease, Mevalonate kinase deficiency, PFAPA (Periodic fever syndrome, aphthous stomatitis, pharyngitis, and cervical adenitis) or TRAPS (tumor necrosis factor (TNF) receptor–associated periodic fever syndrome))
 Episodic, affecting the joints (Gout)
 Episodic, affecting bone (Chronic recurrent multifocal osteomyelitis (CRMO))
 Persistent and multisystemic (Schnitzler syndrome, Crohn's disease, or DIRA)
 Persistent, affecting the skin (Interleukin-36-receptor antagonist deficiency (DITRA), Sweet syndrome or Neutrophilic panniculitis)

Molecular mechanism of the origin 
 Inflammasome activation (Mevalonate kinase deficiency or Muckle–Wells syndrome)
 NFκB activation (NLRP12-associated disease, Crohn's disease or Blau syndrome)
 IL‑1β pathway dysregulation (PFAPA, Schnitzler syndrome, DIRA or DITRA)
 Impaired efficacy of cytotoxic T lymphocytes with compensatory macrophage activation (Familial hemophagocytic lymphohistiocytosis (HLH))
 Inactivation of IL‑10 signaling (Early-onset enterocolitis)
 Multiple (TRAPS) and Uncharacterized (CRMO or Behçet disease)

Simplified classification by the predominant cytokine or pathway 
 IL-1 mediated
 IFN-mediated
 Mediated by increased NF-κB activation

Mechanisms of the origin 
Most proteins known to be involved in hereditary AIDs are involved in regulation of interleukin-1 β (IL-1β). Their mutations induce increased and/or prolonged secretion of IL-1β, a proinflammatory and pyrogenic cytokine.

Patients with AIDs often suffer from noninfectious fever and systemic and/or disease-specific organ inflammation. The over-secretion of proinflammatory cytokines and chemokines lead to organ damage and can be life-threatening. For such patients, excessive IL-1 signaling, constitutive NF-κB activation, and chronicthe  IFN I signaling is specific. Some AIDs seemingly do not have any specific pivotal proinflammatory mediators, being caused by accumulation of metabolites or triggered by intracellular stress or cell death.

Loss of negative regulators 
Loss of negative regulators results in inability to attenuate proinflammatory cytokine responses, causing autoinflammation.

Among these negative regulators, antagonists of IL-1 receptor (IL-1Ra) or IL-36 receptor (IL-36Ra) can be concluded. Loss-of-function mutations of IL-1Ra can develop fatal systemic inflammatory response syndrome. Another example is the inability of the anti-inflammatory cytokines, such as IL-10, signal through its receptor. That, again, can lead to systemic inflammation and severe inflammatory bowel disease (IBD). This provides that even single-cytokine dysregulation can cause autoinflammatory diseases. There are also mutations which can change the ability of cytotoxic cells to induce cell death, resulting in failure to terminate macrophage and dendritic cells activation and cause macrophage activation syndrome.

Inflammasomopathies 

As indicated above, AIDs are caused by abnormal innate immune activation and, in the case of inflammasopathies, are attributable to activation of an inflammasome complex nucleated by innate immune sensors such as NLRP1 (nucleotide-binding oligomerization domain(NOD)-like receptors), pyrin or NLRC4 (NOD-like receptors (NLR) Family CARD Domain Containing 4).

Inflammasomes are cytoplasmic protein complexes, which are able to generate active, secreted IL-1β and IL-18 from a cell. The sensors of the innate immunity help to activate caspase 1 from pro-caspase 1. When activated, caspase 1 cleaves precursors of the pro-inflammatory cytokines pro-IL-1β and pro-IL-18 to their active forms.

NLRP1 
There have been reports of patients with activating mutations in NLRP1, where arginine is affected. There is a de novo heterozygous Pro1214Arg substitution in some cases, while in the others there is a homozygous arginine to tryptophan substitution at position 726 (R726W). It has been shown that the mutation position matters: Pro1214Arg is located in the FIIND (from function to find domain) domain, which is important for NLRP1 activation, R726W is located in the linker region between the NOD and LRR (from leucine rich) domains.

All of the patients with such mutations exhibited dyskeratosis, arthritis, recurrent fever episodes, recurrent elevated CRP (from C-reactive protein) levels and vitamin A deficiency.

Among AIDs caused by NLRP1 mutation belong multiple self-healing palmoplantar carcinoma (MSPC) and familial keratosis lichenoides chronica (FKLC).

Pyrin 
A hereditary disorder driven by pyrin mutation, called PAAND (Pyrin-associated autoinflammation with neutrophilic dermatosis), is characterised by neutrophilic dermatosis, recurrent fever, increased acute-phase reactants, arthralgia or myalgia.

Patients with PAAND have a serine-to-arginine substitution at position 242 in pyrin. This loss of serine at position 242 causes the inability of 14-3-3 to bind to this region and to inhibit pyrin, resulting in spontaneous inflammasome formation by pyrin, increased recruitment of pro-caspase-1 via ASC (from adaptor molecule apoptosis-associated speck-like protein containing a CARD), increased IL-1β secretion and pyroptosis.

The 14-3-3 molecule is able to bind and inhibit pyrin inflammasome activity due to the RhoA activity. RhoA regulates pyrin through activation of serine-threonine kinases, which phosphorylate serine of pyrin at S208 and S242 and allow signalling molecule 14-3-3 to bind pyrin. Already mentioned serine-to-arginine substitution at position 242 in pyrin causes the loss of RhoA activity, and thus activation of the pyrin inflammasome.

One of the best-known pyrin AIDs is Mevalonate kinase deficiency, which is an enzyme in the cholesterol biosynthesis pathway. This loss/lack of enzyme results in mevalonic aciduria (MVA) and hyperimmunoglobulinemia D syndrome (HIDS).

Relopathies (NFkBopathies) 
It has been proven that NF-κB (nuclear factor κB) is overactivated in cells of the gut mucosa of patients with inflammatory bowel diseases, including Crohn's disease (CD), which is a well known AID. The constitutive activation of NF-κB, not only in CD, is in particular caused by alanine (A20) deficiency.

NFκB pathway is tightly regulated through multiple posttranslational mechanisms including ubiquitination. Mutations in these regulatory pathways often cause diseases connected with malfunctions of NF-κB. The loss-of-function mutations in HOIL-1L and HOIP, which are subunits of the linear ubiquitin chain assembly complex (LUBAC), result in phenotypes, characterized by immunodeficiency, multi-organ autoinflammation and elevated NF-κB signaling. Also the hypomorphic mutations in deubiquitinase enzyme OTULIN (from OTU deubiquitinase with linear linkage specificity), result in elevated NF-κB signaling causing an autoinflammatory syndrome. Similarly, patients with high-penetrance heterozygous mutations in the gene encoding A20 display excessive ubiquitination and increased activity of NFκB. Such patients present with Behçet-like characteristics or an autoimmune lymphoproliferative syndrome (ALPS)-like phenotype.

Interferonpathies 
In addition to antivirus and antitumor effects, interferons (IFNs) also have broad immune-modulating functions, including enhancing the antigen-presentation function of dendritic cells, promoting T lymphocyte response and B lymphocyte antibody production, and restraining proinflammatory cytokine production. The production and signaling of IFNs are tightly regulated and dysregulation has been linked to inflammatory diseases, such as systemic lupus erythometaosus and a growing number of conditions that clinically present as autoinflammatory diseases. It is very often a mutation which somehow influences the expression/function of IFNs. In the case of Aicardi-Goutieres syndrome 7 (AGS7), the gain-of-function mutation in a sensor molecule in the RNA-sensing pathway leads to both spontaneous and enhanced ligand-induced IFN-β transcription.

Dysregulation of proteasomes 
Some AIDs, such as chronic atypical neutrophilic dermatosis with lipodystrophy and elevated temperature (CANDLE), appear to be associated with dysfunction of the proteasome. This syndrome is caused by mutation in the gene which encodes subunit β type-8 of proteasome (PSMB8 gene). Due to this mutation, there is a problem with proteolysis of proteins and their presentation to the cells of innate immunity. This results in accumulation of intermediates in the cell and accumulation of the proteins in the tissues. This leads to elevated cell stress, activation of Janus kinase and production of IFNs.

Persistent macrophage activation 
Systemic activation of macrophages is characterized by the accumulation of activated macrophages, which secrete a large amount of inflammatory mediators, such as cytokines, chemokines, DAMPs, etc. They can become hemophagocytes. Once considered the diagnostic hallmarks of macrophage activation syndrome (MAS) and emophagocytic lymphohistiocytosis (HLH), they can be abundant in organs of the reticuloendothelial system during systemic inflammation. These inflammatory cytokines cannot be cleared and inflammatory mediators cause fever, cytopenias, coagulopathy and central nervous system inflammation, which can progress to sepsis-like pathophysiology, shock and death. The progression of macrophage activation in the context of rheumatic diseases is historically called MAS, and in the context of the familial monogenic defects resulting in impaired NK (natural killer cells) or CD8+ T cell cytotoxicity, it is called HLH. Systemic macrophage activation is also associated with chronic overproduction of IL-18, which may also impair cytotoxicity. Chronic IL-18 exposure may cause impairments in cytotoxicity or NK cell death, thus promoting macrophage activation by priming lymphocyte inflammatory response or disabling/depleting NK cells. IL-18-induced NK cell dysfunction resulting is a defect shared between MAS and cytotoxicity-related HLH. This macrophage activation can be caused by increased activity of intracellular sensor NLRC4 and subsequent constitutive NLRC4 inflammasome activation. The macrophage activation can be due to the loss of negative regulatory effect of cytotoxicity.

References 

Autoinflammatory syndromes